The Miller River is a river in King County, Washington. Named for 1890s prospector John Miller, it is a tributary of the Skykomish River, which it joins near the community of Miller River (which was, prior to World War I, known as Berlin). Miller River Campground is located just downriver from the confluence.

West Fork
The West Fork Miller River begins at the ridge dividing it and the Taylor River. It flows northeast from there, converging with the East Fork near the West Fork Campground. Its only officially named tributaries are Cleopatra and Coney Creeks. Cleopatra Creek drains a basin just north of the West Fork’s source while Coney Creek drains high-elevation Coney Lake. Just above its mouth, the West Fork drops over two small waterfalls, Borderline Falls then Immigration Falls. Access along the West Fork road is currently gated, washed out, and grown over (as of 2015) and there is no known plan for re-opening/repairing the road. Mechanized (Car, Bicycle, Helicopter, etc.) access is prohibited higher up on the roadbed due to Alpine Lakes Wilderness restrictions.

West Fork Tributaries
Gouging Lake Outlet Stream
Cleopatra Creek
Coney Creek
Francis Lake Outlet Stream

East Fork
Upon exiting the lake, the river drops over a headwall as it makes its way toward the bottom of Camp Robber Valley. Florence Falls occurs near the bottom of the headwall. Shortly after the falls, the river is joined by Camp Robber Creek, from the south, then Smith Creek from the west. Flowing north, the East Fork is joined by several unnamed tributaries. Great Falls Creek, which drains tiny Tumwater Lake, joins from the west.

East Fork Tributaries
Camp Robber Creek
Smith Creek
Hinter Lake Outlet Stream
Purvis Lake Outlet Stream
Great Falls Creek

Mainstream
From its source at the confluence of the East and West Forks, the Miller River flows north to its confluence with the Skykomish River near the community of Miller River. A major tributary is Happy Thought Creek, which drains small Cleveland Lake. Mohawk Creek flows joins the North Fork upstream of Happy Thought Creek and about 1/4 of a mile downstream of the West Fork.

Mainstream Tributaries
Happy Thought Creek
Mohawk Creek

See also
Miller River Waterfalls
List of rivers in Washington
Lake Dorothy

References

Rivers of Washington (state)
Rivers of King County, Washington